The 1979 National Rowing Championships was the eighth edition of the National Championships, held from 20–21 July 1979 at the National Water Sports Centre in Holme Pierrepont, Nottingham.

Senior

Medal summary

Lightweight

Medal summary

Junior

Medal summary 

Key

References 

British Rowing Championships
British Rowing Championships
British Rowing Championships